Anthony Valletta (21 December 1908 – 8 December 1988 in Birkirkara, Malta) was a well known teacher, lepidopterist and naturalist. He was a Fellow of the Royal Entomological Society. He wrote several books on nature in the Maltese Islands, such as Know the Trees and Know the Birds. He also discovered a sub-species of moth which has been named after him - Pterolonche vallettae. His collection of butterflies and insects was the largest in Malta. He was one of the first people in Malta to start a public consciousness to protect the island's environmental heritage.

He was a headteacher at three state schools, in Luqa, Għaxaq and Birkirkara and later an inspector of government schools for the Department of Education. Birkirkara Primary School was named after him.

Published books
Know the birds (1954)
Know the wild flowers (1955)
Know the trees (1959)
The butterflies of the Maltese Islands (1971)
The moths of the Maltese Islands (1972)
Mit-tfulija man-natura (Since childhood with nature) - an autobiography (1983)

References

1908 births
1988 deaths
Maltese schoolteachers
20th-century naturalists
Lepidopterists
20th-century zoologists